Almog Ohayon (born 5 August 1994) is an Israeli footballer currently with Hapoel Kfar Saba.

Career statistics

Club

Notes

References

External links

1994 births
Living people
Israeli footballers
Maccabi Ironi Kiryat Ata F.C. players
Hapoel Haifa F.C. players
Maccabi Petah Tikva F.C. players
Ironi Tiberias F.C. players
Hapoel Beit She'an F.C. players
Hapoel Ironi Baqa al-Gharbiyye F.C. players
Hapoel Kfar Saba F.C. players
Hapoel Kfar Shalem F.C. players
Hapoel Petah Tikva F.C. players
FC Lori players
Ironi Nesher F.C. players
Israeli Premier League players
Liga Leumit players
Armenian Premier League players
Israeli expatriate footballers
Expatriate footballers in Armenia
Israeli expatriate sportspeople in Armenia
Association football midfielders